Tetris 2 is one of various sequels to the original Tetris tile-matching puzzle video game released in 1984, generally referring to improvements or new modes added to a platform-specific port of Tetris released by a particular publisher.

Tetris 2 may refer to:
Tetris 2 (1990 video game) for the ZX Spectrum, published by Ultrasoft
Tetris 2 (1993 video game) for the Nintendo Entertainment System, Game Boy and Super Nintendo Entertainment System published by Nintendo

See also
List of Tetris variants